OBN may refer to:

OBN, IATA code for Oban Airport in Scotland
Ocean Bottom Nightmare, a rock band from Nottingham, England
Oceania Broadcasting Network, a free-to-air television network in Tonga
Oklahoma Bureau of Narcotics and Dangerous Drugs Control, a state law enforcement agency in Oklahoma, US
Omni Broadcasting Network (2003–2013), former US regional television network
"Order Of The Brown Nose", a mock honour awarded by British satirical magazine Private Eye for published examples of sycophancy
Oromia Broadcasting Network, a regional broadcaster in Ethiopia
OBN Televizija, a terrestrial television network in Bosnia-Herzegovina